Alisa Georgievna Koonen, also known as Alice Coonen ( – August 20, 1974), was a Russian and Soviet actress and the wife of the director Alexander Tairov.

Biography

Early life 
Koonen was born in Moscow in a family of Belgian origin. At age 16 she joined the Moscow Art Theatre and studied with Stanislavski. She first appeared on the stage in Woe from Wit in 1906.

Career 
At 19 she had her first major role, Mytyl in The Blue Bird (1908); she also performed Masha in Leo Tolstoy’s The Living Corpse and Anitra in Ibsen’s Peer Gynt. In 1913, Koonen moved to the Free Theatre of Konstantin Mardzhanov, which lasted only one season. There she met and married Tairov, and in 1914 they created the Chamber Theater, where she became a leading actress. She had a wide range, but became best known as a tragic actress; Mark Slonim called her "an unusually talented interpreter of tragic parts, endowed with a rich voice and rhythmic power." After the October Revolution, in 1918 Tairov "presented Oscar Wilde's Salomé to haggard, starved audiences who jammed the frozen hall"; Koonen was "a passionate, aggressive Salomé." In 1949, Koonen left the theater with her husband, who died the following year.

According to The Great Soviet Encyclopedia, her most outstanding role was the Woman Commissar in Vsevolod Vishnevsky’s An Optimistic Tragedy (1933); her other great roles included the heroine of Scribe and Legouvé’s Adrienne Lecouvreur, Abbie in Eugene O'Neill’s Desire Under the Elms and Ella in his The Hairy Ape, Ellen in Sophie Treadwell's Machinal, Katerina in Alexander Ostrovsky's The Storm, the title role in the stage adaptation of Flaubert’s Madame Bovary, and Kruchinina in Ostrovsky's Guilty Without Fault (Bez viny vinovatye). Her concert repertoire included verses by Alexander Blok and Ivan Turgenev as well as selections from Chamber Theater productions.

Death 
On August 20, 1974, Koonen passed away in Moscow and was buried at Novodevichy Cemetery.

Awards and accolades
 People's Artist of the RSFSR (1935)
 Order of the Red Banner of Labour (1954)

References

1889 births
1974 deaths
20th-century Russian actresses
Actresses from Moscow
People's Artists of the RSFSR
Recipients of the Order of the Red Banner of Labour
Russian people of Belgian descent
Russian stage actresses
Soviet stage actresses
Burials at Novodevichy Cemetery